Miňovce is a village and municipality in Stropkov District in the Prešov Region of north-eastern Slovakia.

History
In historical records the village was first mentioned in 1430.

Geography
The municipality lies at an altitude of 176 metres and covers an area of 6.002 km². It has a population of about 348 people.

References

External links
 
 

Villages and municipalities in Stropkov District